The Heves County Assembly is the local legislative body of Heves County in the Northern Hungary, in Hungary.

Composition

2019–2024 period
The Assembly elected at the 2019 local government elections, is made up of 15 counselors, with the following party composition:

After the elections in 2019 the Assembly controlled by the Fidesz–KDNP party alliance which has 9 councillors, 
versus 6 DK-Jobbik-Hungarian Socialist Party (MSZP)-Momentum Movement-Everybody's Hungary Movement (MMM) councillors.

2014–2019 period
The Assembly elected at the 2014 local government elections, is made up of 15 counselors, with the following party composition:

After the elections in 2014 the Assembly controlled by the Fidesz–KDNP party alliance which has 8 councillors, versus 4 Jobbik, 2 Hungarian Socialist Party (MSZP) and 1 Democratic Coalition (DK) councillors.

2010–2014 period
The Assembly elected at the 2010 local government elections, is made up of 15 counselors, with the following party composition:

After the elections in 2010 the Assembly controlled by the Fidesz–KDNP party alliance which has 8 councillors, versus 4 Hungarian Socialist Party (MSZP) and 3 Jobbik councillors.

Presidents of the Assembly
So far, the presidents of the Heves County Assembly have been:

 1990–1998 István Jakab, Hungarian Socialist Party (MSZP)
 1998–2010 Tamás Sós, Hungarian Socialist Party (MSZP)
 2010 László Horváth, Fidesz–KDNP
 2011–2019 Róbert Szabó, Fidesz–KDNP
 since 2019 Attila Simon Juhász, Fidesz–KDNP

References

Local government in Hungary
Heves County